Annie Chemis ( 24 May 1862–21 February 1939) was a New Zealand homemaker, dairy worker, petitioner and charwoman. She was born in County Kerry, Ireland on 24 May 1862. Her husband Louis Chemis was imprisoned for the murder of Thomas Hawkings in 1889, and after his eventual release from prison in 1897, committed suicide by blowing himself up with dynamite.

References

1862 births
1939 deaths
Irish emigrants to New Zealand (before 1923)
People from County Kerry
19th-century New Zealand people